Pálmi Gunnarsson (born 29 September 1950) is an Icelandic musician, who was involved in some of the country's most popular musical acts in the 1970s and into the 1980s, including Mannakorn and Brunaliðið. He is perhaps best known internationally as a member of ICY, the trio that performed "Gleðibankinn", Iceland's first ever entry in the Eurovision Song Contest, in 1986.

In a career that has lasted over four decades, Pálmi has played with many bands across many genres, and enjoys enduring popularity around Iceland, often with songs written by his longtime collaborator Magnús Eiríksson. Several of Pálmi's recordings have become Icelandic pop classics, including his cover of Magnús Þór Sigmundsson's song Ísland er land þitt, and the Christmas song Gleði og friðarjól, composed by Magnús Eiríksson.

Discography

Albums
Þuríður & Pálmi  (1973) (Þuríður Sigurðardóttir on side 1, Pálmi Gunnarsson on side 2)
Hvers vegna varst' ekki kyrr?  (1980)
Jólamyndir (1994)
Séð og heyrt (1999)
Þorparinn (2013)

Songs
Gleðibankinn (1986)  (as part of ICY)
"Ísland er land þitt"
"Gleði og friðarjól"
"Núna" (2013)

References

1950 births
Living people
20th-century Icelandic male singers
Eurovision Song Contest entrants of 1986
Eurovision Song Contest entrants for Iceland